The 2015–16 AJIHL season is the fourth season of the Australian Junior Ice Hockey League. It ran from 29 October 2015 until 21 February 2016, with the finals running from 27 February 2016 until 28 February 2016. The AJIHL is the highest Australian national junior ice hockey competition.

League business
Ice Hockey Australia made the announcement that the Australian Junior Ice Hockey League would be expanding in the 2015–16 season. It planned to include teams from Queensland, South Australia and Australian Capital Territory. This did not happen, however, and the league remains at 6 teams.

On 21 January it was announced that an "AJIHL Tier 2" tournament would take place, involving a state team representing Queensland, Australian Capital Territory and South Australia. This tournament gives one of these teams a chance to enter into the AJIHL finals as a wild card team. The team names are: Brisbane Blitz, Canberra Junior Brave and Adelaide Generals.

Tournament Format
When ice time is available, the first 2 periods are 15 mins running time and the third period is stop time. These games are indicated on the schedule by having 1.5 hrs. The ice is to be resurfaced between the 2nd & 3rd period of each game. When a game cannot have the 3rd period as stop time, the last 5 mins of the 3rd period is stop time, these games are indicated by 1.0hr.
Games that result in a tied score go straight to penalty shootout.
Game points will be applied as follows:
a) Win = 3 points
b) Shootout win = 2 points
c) Shootout loss = 1 point
d) Tie = 1 point
e) Loss = 0 points
The top 2 teams at the end of the round robin will play a final with the winning team receiving the wild card entry into the AJIHL finals. 

The tournament is held in Phillip Ice Skating Centre.

Regular season
The regular season will begin on 29 October 2015 and ran through to 21 February 2015 before the teams compete in the playoff series.

October

November

December

January

February

Standings
Note: GP = Games played; W = Wins; SW = Shootout Wins; SL = Shootout losses; L = Losses; GF = Goals for; GA = Goals against; GDF = Goal differential; PTS = Points

The regular season league standings are as follows:

Scoring leaders
Note: GP = Games played; G = Goals; A = Assists; Pts = Points; PIM = Penalty minutes

Leading goaltenders
Note: GP = Games played; Mins = Minutes played; W = Wins; L = Losses: OTL = Overtime losses; SL = Shootout losses; GA = Goals Allowed; SO = Shutouts; GAA = Goals against average

AJIHL Tier 2 Wild Card Tournament

AJIHL Tier 2 Tournament Standings
Note: GP = Games played; W = Wins; SW = Shootout Wins; SL = Shootout losses; L = Losses; GF = Goals for; GA = Goals against; GDF = Goal differential; PTS = Points

The regular season league standings are as follows:

AJIHL Tier 2 Wild Card Championship

Playoffs

Western Australia State Semi Final 1

New South Wales State Semi Final 1

Victoria State Semi Final 1

New South Wales State Semi Final 2

Victoria State Semi Final 2

Western Australia State Semi Final 2

Semi Final 1

Semi Final 2

Qualifying Final

Grand Final

References

External links
Ice Hockey Australia
AJIHL Coverage - Hewitt Sports

AJIHL
AJIHL
AJIHL
Australian Junior Ice Hockey League